Christopher John Hipkins (born 5 September 1978) is a New Zealand politician who has been serving as the 41st prime minister of New Zealand and leader of the New Zealand Labour Party since 2023. He has been the member of Parliament (MP) for Remutaka since the 2008 election.

Hipkins served in opposition as Labour's education spokesperson. In the current Sixth Labour Government, Hipkins has served as minister of education, police, the public service, and leader of the House. He became a prominent figure as a result of the COVID-19 pandemic in New Zealand, taking on the roles of minister of health from July to November 2020 and minister for COVID-19 response from November 2020 to June 2022.

On 21 January 2023, Hipkins became the sole candidate to succeed Jacinda Ardern as leader of the Labour Party after she announced her resignation. He became party leader after being elected unopposed on 22 January 2023, and was consequently appointed prime minister by the governor-general on 25 January 2023. He is expected to lead the Labour Party into the 2023 general election. His premiership was faced almost immediately with the 2023 North Island floods, and then by further flooding from Cyclone Gabrielle.

Early life
Christopher John Hipkins was born in the Hutt Valley on 5 September 1978, the son of Doug and Rosemary Hipkins. His mother is the chief researcher for the New Zealand Council for Educational Research. 

He attended Waterloo Primary School and Hutt Intermediate School. He was head boy at Hutt Valley Memorial College (later known as Petone College) in 1996. He later studied at the Victoria University of Wellington, where he was student president in 2000 and 2001.

In September 1997, as a first-year student at Victoria University of Wellington, Hipkins was one of dozens arrested while protesting against the Tertiary Review Green Bill at Parliament. The matter went through the courts, and 10 years later an apology and award of over $200,000 was shared among the 41 protesters. The judge ruled that despite claims by police that the protestors were violent, the protest was peaceful and there were no grounds for arrest. 

Hipkins received a Bachelor of Arts with a major in politics and criminology from Victoria University of Wellington. He then held a number of jobs, including working as a policy advisor for the Industry Training Federation, and as a training manager for Todd Energy in Taranaki. Hipkins also worked in Parliament as an advisor to Trevor Mallard and Helen Clark.

Political career

 Hipkins was selected to stand in the Labour-held seat of Rimutaka (renamed Remutaka in 2020) in the 2008 general election, following the retirement of the sitting MP Paul Swain. He contested the Labour selection over trade unionist Paul Chalmers, who had Swain's support. His selection was part of Prime Minister Helen Clark's intention to rejuvenate the party with 29-year-old Hipkins winning against the 54-year-old Chalmers. In his first election, Hipkins won the seat with a majority of 753 and comfortably retained the electorate on each subsequent attempt. In the 2020 general election, he had the highest majority of any successful candidate other than Ardern.

In Opposition, 2008–2017
For the first nine years of Hipkins' parliamentary career, Labour formed the Official Opposition. In his first term, Hipkins was the Labour spokesperson for internal affairs and a member of parliamentary committees for government administration, local government and environment, and transport and infrastructure. In May 2010, his Electricity (Renewable Preference) Amendment Bill was drawn from the member's ballot. The bill would have reinstated a ban on the thermal generation of electricity which had been imposed by the previous Labour Government in September 2008 before being repealed by the incoming National Government in December 2008, but was defeated at its first reading in June.

In Hipkins' second term, he was promoted into Labour's shadow Cabinet as spokesperson for state services and education under new leader, David Shearer. He also became the Labour Party's chief whip for the first time. As education spokesperson, Hipkins was outspoken in his opposition to the National Government's implementation of charter schools in New Zealand and closure of schools in Christchurch following the destructive 2011 earthquake. He continued as education spokesperson under subsequent leaders David Cunliffe, Andrew Little and Ardern. Under Little and Ardern, Hipkins was additionally shadow leader of the House. 

In April 2013, Hipkins voted in favour of the Marriage (Definition of Marriage) Amendment Bill, which legalised same-sex marriage in New Zealand. In late 2015, Hipkins received veiled threats, including a death threat, for voicing his concerns about a billboard advertising "cut-price" guns.

In April 2016, his Education (Charter Schools Abolition) Amendment Bill was drawn from the members' ballot. It was defeated at its first reading in November.

In Government, 2017–present
As a senior Labour MP, Hipkins was a key figure in the Sixth Labour Government. Between 2017 and 2023, he was the sixth-ranked Government minister from the Labour Party and he was assigned responsibilities as minister of education, minister for the public service and leader of the House. He was later looked upon as a "fixer," and was given additional responsibility as minister of health and minister for COVID-19 response during the COVID-19 pandemic in New Zealand, and later as minister of police during a spate of ram-raids. He emerged as the Labour Party's "consensus candidate" in a January 2023 leadership election triggered by the resignation of Ardern.

First term (2017–2020) 
Hipkins was elected as a Cabinet minister by the Labour Party caucus following the formation of a Labour–New Zealand First coalition government supported by the Greens. It was later announced that he would serve as minister for education.

As education minister, Hipkins has supported the abolition of National Standards and charter schools in New Zealand, which were supported by the previous National Government. He has also signaled a review of the National Certificate of Educational Achievement (NCEA) high school certificate system. However, Hipkins has clarified that the Ministry of Education would continue to fund the University of Otago's National Monitoring Study of Student Achievement and the Progress and Consistency Tool (PaCT). The Government's announcement that it would close charter schools drew criticism from the opposition National and ACT parties. In early 2018, Hipkins introduced legislation preventing the creation of new charter schools, while enabling existing charter schools to be converted into special character schools. By September 2018, all twelve charter schools had successfully transitioned to become state-integrated and special character schools.

In December 2018, Hipkins rejected a recommendation by the Council of Victoria University of Wellington to rename the university "University of Wellington", citing the strong opposition to the name change from staff, students, and alumni. Hipkins said that "he was not convinced the university had sufficiently engaged with stakeholders, who should have their views considered."

In February 2019, Hipkins proposed merging the country's 16 polytechnics into a New Zealand Institute of Skills and Technology to counter deficits and declining domestic enrolments. This proposed Institute of Skills and Technology will also take over the country's vocational and apprenticeship programmes. While the Tertiary Education Union, Employers and Manufacturers Union, and the Canterbury Employers' Chamber of Commerce have expressed support for the Government's proposal, this has been criticised by the opposition National Party, Southern Institute of Technology CEO Penny Simmonds, and Mayor of Invercargill Tim Shadbolt. In response to the Christchurch mosque shootings, Hipkins extended the polytechnic submission timeframe to 5 April 2019.

In early May 2019, Hipkins announced that the Government would be investing NZ$95 million to train 2,400 new teacher trainees through increased scholarships and placements, new employment-based teacher education programmes, and iwi-based scholarships over the next four years to address the teaching shortage. These measures were criticised as inadequate by the Post Primary Teachers' Association and National Party education spokesperson Nikki Kaye.

On 1 August 2019, Hipkins reaffirmed the Government's plan to merge all polytechnics into a single entity in April 2020. In addition, he announced that the Government would replace all 11 industrial training organisations (ITOs) with between four and seven workforce development councils that would be set up by 2022 to influence vocational education and training. While polytechnics have been cautiously optimistic about the changes despite concerns about losing their autonomy, ITOs and National's tertiary education spokesperson Shane Reti have opposed these changes, claiming they would damage the vocational training system and cause job losses. By 2022, the merger began to strike difficulties including low enrolments, large deficits and resignations of senior staff. 

Following the resignation of David Clark as minister of health on 2 July 2020, Prime Minister Ardern appointed Hipkins as interim health minister, serving until the October 2020 general election.

Second term (2020–2023) 
In early November 2020, Hipkins retained his education portfolio. He was also designated as minister for COVID-19 response and minister for the Public Service.

On 22 August 2021, Hipkins made a comment that attracted controversy and humour when he misspoke during a press conference; encouraging New Zealanders to get tested for COVID-19, he inadvertently urged New Zealanders to socially distance when they go outside to "spread their legs". Commentators suggested that he meant to say "spread your wings".

On 31 January 2022, Hipkins, in his capacity as minister for COVID-19 response, issued a statement that the Government had offered stranded New Zealand journalist Charlotte Bellis a place under the emergency allocation criteria to travel to New Zealand within a period of 14 days. However, he also claimed that Bellis had indicated that she did not intend to travel until late February and that MIQ had advised her to consider moving her travel plans forward. He also confirmed that New Zealand consular assistance had earlier twice offered to help her return from Afghanistan in December 2021. Bellis was an Al Jazeera journalist who had left Qatar after becoming pregnant due to the Gulf State's law criminalising unmarried pregnancies. Bellis had travelled to Afghanistan where she and her partner had visas allowing them to live there. Due to New Zealand's strict pandemic border policies, Bellis had struggled to secure a place in the Managed Isolation and Quarantine (MIQ) system. 

Hipkins was criticised by Bellis' lawyer Tudor Clee for allegedly breaching her client's privacy by sharing personal details about her circumstances and indicated that she was considering "legal options." In response, Bellis stated that she did not give Hipkins consent to share her information and disputed the facts in his statement. MPs Chris Bishop and David Seymour, from National and ACT respectively, also criticised Hipkins' actions, stating that they were "unbecoming" of a minister of the Crown. On 22 June 2022, Hipkins publicly apologised for releasing personal information without Bellis' consent and making inaccurate comments about Bellis travelling to Afghanistan and being offered consular assistance. As a result, Bellis and her partner Jim Huylebroek received online abuse. Hipkins had earlier privately apologised to Bellis in mid-March 2022.

In a June 2022 reshuffle, Hipkins was shifted from his COVID-19 response portfolio and replaced Poto Williams as minister of police.

In September 2022, Hipkins apologised to former Finance Minister Bill English for suggesting that he had granted his brothers favourable government contracts. Hipkins had made those remarks during an exchange over the awarding of government contracts to Foreign Minister Nanaia Mahuta's husband Gannin Ormsby.

Prime Minister (2023–present)

Nomination and appointment 

Jacinda Ardern unexpectedly announced her resignation as leader of the Labour Party in a media conference on 19 January 2023, stating that she "no longer had enough in the tank" to do the job. She indicated that she would formally step down no later than 7 February 2023.

Hipkins was confirmed as the only nominee shortly after nominations closed at 9:00 a.m. on 21 January. Stuff reported that Kiritapu Allan, the East Coast MP and minister of justice who had been speculated by media as an alternative candidate, was one of the seven MPs who nominated him. Hipkins had previously demurred when asked about his leadership aspirations, stating that he would support whichever candidate the Labour Party could "reach a consensus" on. In a media standup outside Parliament at 1:00 p.m. on 21 January, Hipkins commented that he discovered he had emerged as that consensus candidate as "the door to the plane [that he had boarded for a flight to Wellington] was closing", leaving him unable to respond to his messages for 40 minutes. The formal meeting to confirm Hipkins as leader was scheduled for 1:00 p.m. on 22 January 2023. 

Hipkins was sworn in as prime minister by Governor-General Dame Cindy Kiro on 25 January 2023. His deputy prime minister is Carmel Sepuloni, the first Pasifika to hold the position. Upon taking office, Hipkins addressed the cost of living, saying that New Zealanders will "absolutely see in the coming weeks and months the cost of living is right at the heart of our work program", and declared it his "absolute priority". He indicated that Labour would postpone some of its new projects until after the election to focus on the economy.

Domestic affairs
On 26 January, Hipkins met several Auckland business leaders at a roundtable event hosted by the Auckland Business Chamber, led by former National MP Simon Bridges. During the meeting, Hipkins affirmed his Government's commitment to pursuing a constructive relationship with businesses, citing their importance to the New Zealand economy. Hipkins also confirmed that business representatives had given the Government feedback on several policy areas including skills shortages. Hipkins also stated that businesses supported the Government's apprenticeship boost, which created opportunities for them.  Earlier, several small business owners including Kiwi Kai business owner Reni Gargiulo, Air Milford CEO Hank Sproull, Christchurch pharmacy owner Annabel Turley, Saint Andrews Dairy Dhaval Amin, and Grownup Donuts owner Daniel Black had called on Hipkins' Government to address various issues including staffing shortages, immigration work visa policies, youth crime, and inflation. In addition, Ashburton dairy farmer Nick Gier called on the Government to scrap the Three Waters reform programme and carbon emissions taxes on the agricultural sector.

Hipkins was faced almost immediately with the 2023 North Island floods. The flash flooding began on 27 January 2023, and saw an entire summer's worth of rain fall within just a day. On 28 January, Hipkins and Minister for Emergency Management Kieran McAnulty visited Auckland to liaise with emergency services, reassure affected constituents, and assess the damage. Hipkins subsequently attended a press conference in West Auckland with MacAnulty, Mayor of Auckland Wayne Brown, and Minister of Transport Michael Wood.

After Hipkins' ascension to the role of Prime Minister and his response to the recent floods, opinion polls saw his personal popularity and that of the Labour Party surge: a 1News–Kantar poll had Labour up 5 percentage points to 38, with National dropping one percentage point to 37; Hipkins also had a net approval of 36 points, with National Leader Christopher Luxon trailing on 9 points. Another poll conducted by Newshub–Reid Research had Labour up 5.7 points to 38, ahead of National, which fell 4.1 points, dropping to 36.6.

In February 2023, Hipkins announced that several policies including the proposed TVNZ–Radio New Zealand merger and that a biofuel mandate requiring petrol and diesel to contain a certain percentage of biofuel from renewable resources would be scrapped. In addition, Hipkins confirmed that other policies including the social income insurance scheme, proposed hate speech legislation, and the Three Waters reform programme would be delayed or revised. Hipkins also confirmed that the minimum wage would be raised from NZ$21.20 to NZ$22.70 an hour from 1 April 2023. In response to the recent North Island floods, Hipkins conformed that the Government would invest NZ$3 million in discretionary flood recovery payments, NZ$1 million in supporting flood-affected businesses, and an additional NZ$1 million in mental health support.

On 13 March, Hipkins announced that the Government would scrap several policies and reform programmes including legislation to lower the voting age to 16 years, the speed reduction programme except for the most dangerous 1% of highways, and the NZ$586 million Clean Car Upgrade programme. In addition, the Government announced that it would delay or revise several policies and programmes including proposed alcohol reforms, the container return scheme, public transportation including the Auckland Light Rail, and public consultation on a new test to determine the difference between contractors and employees. The Government would redirect funding to a NZ$2 billion to a welfare package to provide "bread and butter" support to 1.4 million New Zealanders affected by the ongoing "cost of living" crisis. While the Green and Māori parties criticised the Government for backtracking on climate action policies, the National and ACT parties welcomed the scrapping of "wasteful" Government policies but questioned the Government's commitment to change.

Foreign affairs
On 7 February, Hipkins undertook his first state visit to the Australian capital Canberra where he met Australian Prime Minister Anthony Albanese. While the two leaders reaffirmed Australian–New Zealand bilateral relations, they also discussed the controversial Section 501 deportation policy. During the visit, Albanese confirmed that his government would revise the deportation policy to take into account individuals' connections to Australia and the length of time they had lived in the country. During the visit, the two leaders exchanged gifts; with Hipkins gifting Albanese a greenstone pounamu in the shape of a hook and Albanese giving several Australian records including music from Thelma Plum, Gang of Youths and Alex the Astronaut.

Personal life 
Hipkins and his wife Jade were married in 2020 in a ceremony held at Premier House, Wellington, with Grant Robertson serving as best man. He has two children. He and his wife have since separated. When he took extended paternity leave for the birth of his second child in 2018, he was one of the first senior male cabinet ministers to do so.

Hipkins is nicknamed "Chippy", a diminutive name derived from his initials, but reflective of his "upbeat, slightly schoolboyish demeanour".

He is known for his enjoyment of sausage rolls and Coke Zero.

References

External links

 Profile on the New Zealand Parliament website
 Profile at New Zealand Labour Party
 MPs webpage
 

|-

|-

|-

|-

|-

|-

|-

|-

|-

|-

|-

|-

 
1978 births
Living people
People from the Wellington Region
Prime Ministers of New Zealand
New Zealand Labour Party leaders
New Zealand Labour Party MPs
Members of the Cabinet of New Zealand
New Zealand education ministers
Members of the New Zealand House of Representatives
New Zealand MPs for Hutt Valley electorates
Candidates in the 2017 New Zealand general election
Candidates in the 2020 New Zealand general election
Victoria University of Wellington alumni
Victoria University of Wellington Students' Association presidents
20th-century New Zealand people
21st-century New Zealand politicians